The Yellow Dragon Sports Center Stadium is a stadium also used for cultural events such as music concerts and celebrations, located in the center of the city of Hangzhou, Zhejiang province, China. Huanglong means "Yellow Dragon" in Chinese. It is the home of local football club Zhejiang Professional F.C.

The center, built between 1997 and 2003, includes an association football stadium with a running track, an indoor arena, outdoor track and field practice facility, a sports hotel, a press center, and other facilities for sports such as rhythmic gymnastics, tennis, diving and chess.

The stadium is one of the main sports venues in Hangzhou, together with the 14,000-capacity Jianggan District Culture and Sports Center Stadium and the 80,000-capacity Hangzhou Sports Park Stadium.

Yellow Dragon Stadium or Huanglong Stadium is an outdoor association football stadium and the main feature of the Yellow Dragon Sports Center. The facility seats 51,000 people and was completed in 2000. It is used by the local football team and was one of the venues of the FIFA Women's World Cup 2007 held in September 2007, for group phase games and the Brazil-USA semifinal. It was referred to by FIFA as Hangzhou Dragon Stadium.

The structure is circular in shape and has a partial roof covering the seating sections that is supported by two dual suspension towers on opposing ends of the stadium.

After Hangzhou became the host of the 2022 Asian Games in September 2015 which the stadium was originally intended as the main venue, it hosted the football quarter-finals and semi-finals, and the women's gold medal final.

Yellow Dragon Gymnasium
Yellow Dragon Gymnasium or Huanglong Gymnasium is an indoor arena seating 8,000 people, which was officially put into service on 21 September 2003. It was constructed at a cost of 160 million RMB (roughly 19 million USD). The arena can accommodate figure skating and ice hockey, as well as a variety of indoor sports. It is also used for music concerts.

It is adjacent to the stadium in the northeast direction. This was originally designed by Soviet experts in the 1950s and endorsed by Later Premier Zhou Enlai. When Zhou Enlai visited Hangzhou in the early 1970s, he repeated this plan to local officials.

Notable events
On 24 February 2012, Irish vocal pop band Westlife held a concert for Greatest Hits supporting their album Greatest Hits.

On 8 September 2018, Joker Xue, a Chinese singer-songwriter, headlined the stadium as part of his Skyscraper World Tour.

References

External links
Official website 
"The initial plan and description of the Dragon Sport Center"

Sports venues in Zhejiang
Football venues in Hangzhou
Football venues in China
Buildings and structures in Hangzhou
Zhejiang Professional F.C.
2007 FIFA Women's World Cup stadiums